Peter Brown (born 19 October 1958) is a former Australian rules footballer who played for Carlton and St Kilda in the Victorian Football League (VFL).

Brown started his career as a key forward and was at full-forward in Carlton's 1979 VFL Grand Final win over Collingwood. Brown sought a clearance from Carlton after the 1980 VFL season and joined St Kilda in 1981 with whom he would play mostly in defence.

References

Blueseum profile

1958 births
Living people
Carlton Football Club players
Carlton Football Club Premiership players
St Kilda Football Club players
Australian rules footballers from Victoria (Australia)
One-time VFL/AFL Premiership players